Jonathan M. E. Oppenheimer (born 18 November 1969) is a South African billionaire businessman and conservationist, and the Executive Chairman of Oppenheimer Generations, a former executive of De Beers and a former vice-president of his family's firm, Anglo American Corporation.

Early life and education
Jonathan is the son of former De Beers chairman Nicky Oppenheimer; he is the great-grandson of Anglo-American founder Ernest Oppenheimer, who was the first generation of the family to chair (from 1929) the De Beers diamond mining company in South Africa, founded by Cecil Rhodes in 1888.

He was educated at Harrow School and Christ Church, Oxford. He played first-class cricket for Oxford University Cricket Club.

Career
Jonathan Oppenheimer began his career working at N M Rothschild & Sons, then moved to Anglo American, where he became senior vice-president, in 1999. After leaving Anglo American in 2000, he filled numerous senior roles at De Beers diamond mining company in Southern Africa and London until 2012. He was the third generation of his family to lead De Beers. He was also involved in the transactions to de-list De Beers, in 2001, and to sell the Oppenheimer family stake to Anglo American, in 2012. This sale concluded 85 years of the Oppenheimer family's controlling position in the world's diamond trade.Nicky Oppenheimer & family He is currently the director of E. Oppenheimer & Son Ltd.

In 2003, Jonathan and Nicky Oppenheimer published The Brenthurst Initiative, a policy paper on black economic empowerment in South Africa.

Other activities
Oppenheimer has been involved in many aspects of his family’s activities, including establishing the Brenthurst Foundation, a Johannesburg-based think-tank which examines ways to drive Africa's sustainable growth, and the formation of Tana Africa Capital, a joint venture between the Oppenheimer family and Temasek Holdings (Singapore) to pursue African consumer goods business opportunities.

He has sat on boards and advisory panels, including the Presidential Advisory Committee on the Economy (Malawi), established by the Brenthurst Foundation, and Umicore, a listed specialty chemicals company, as a non-executive director. Alongside his father he founded Oppenheimer Generations, with interests in various companies and non-profits such as the Harambe Entrepreneur Alliance. As Executive Chairman of Oppenheimer Generations, Jonathan is actively involved in all aspects of the family’s private, commercial, and thought leadership activities, including: Oppenheimer Partners, Oppenheimer Generations Asia, Nianova, Shangani Holistic, the Brenthurst Foundation, Oppenheimer Generations Foundation, Oppenheimer Generations – Research & Conservation.

Oppenheimer purchased Tswalu Kalahari Reserve, immediately ended hunting, and improved conditions for wild animals found there. World Wide Fund for Nature recognized Oppenheimer's conservation work in 2007.

In January 2018, Jonathan joined the Board of Trustees of the Carnegie Endowment for International Peace (CEIP).

Personal life
Oppenheimer was married to Jennifer Ward until her death in 2017. He has three children.

See also
Harry Oppenheimer
Mining industry of South Africa

References

External links
AfDB Speakers: Jonathan Oppenheimer
Brenthurst Foundation

1969 births
Alumni of Christ Church, Oxford
South African mining businesspeople
Living people
Jonathan
People educated at Harrow School
South African billionaires
South African businesspeople
South African Anglicans
South African people of German-Jewish descent
Oxford University cricketers
Carnegie Endowment for International Peace